Herman Kline Ankeney (October 14, 1894 – March 6, 1968) was a Republican politician who formerly served in the Ohio House of Representatives.  A member of a prominent family from Xenia, Ohio, Ankeney initially won election to the Ohio House in 1952, to an at-large district for Greene County.  He would win reelection five more times to represent the county.

In 1966, the Voting Rights Act of 1965 allotted population based districts, and Ankeney won election to the newly drawn 10th District.  However, he opted not to run in 1968. Following his time in the legislature, he returned to his family company in Beavercreek, Ohio.

Herman K. Ankeney Middle School in Beavercreek is named in his honor.

References

External links
Beavercreek LSD: Herman K. Ankeney Middle School

1894 births
1968 deaths
People from Beavercreek, Ohio
Republican Party members of the Ohio House of Representatives
20th-century American politicians